Taylor Creek Wilderness is a  wilderness area in the US state of Utah.  It was designated March 30, 2009, as part of the Omnibus Public Land Management Act of 2009.  Located adjacent to the Kolob Canyons region of Zion National Park, it encompasses and protects the upper headwaters of Taylor Creek, a tributary of the Wild & Scenic Virgin River.  Taylor Creek Wilderness is bordered by the Zion Wilderness to the southwest.

See also
 List of U.S. Wilderness Areas
 Wilderness Act

References

External links
 Taylor Creek Wilderness - Wilderness.net
 Map of wilderness areas in northeastern Washington County, Utah

Wilderness areas of Utah
Zion National Park
Protected areas of Washington County, Utah
Bureau of Land Management areas in Utah
Protected areas established in 2009
2009 establishments in Utah